The Lord Chamberlain of Denmark is the highest office of the Royal Household of Denmark, and the most distinguished of the Chamberlains of the Royal Household. The title correspond to the British title Lord Chamberlain of the Household.

The title gives precedence in the 1st Class No. 8 in the Danish order precedence, and the bearer is thus entitled to the style "His/Her Excellency". While the title still exist today by Royal Regulation, it is not in current use, the Queen preferring to appoint Chamberlains, whom there are 115 of in Denmark.

The Historic role of the Lord Chamberlain is now allocated to the Court Marshal of Denmark.

Lord Chamberlains 

This is a list of the Lord Chamberlains of Denmark. The office was not always held continuously.

References 

Chamberlains
Honours systems